Gerger District is a district of Adıyaman Province of Turkey. Its seat is the town Gerger. Its area is 668 km2, and its population is 16,416 (2021).

Composition
There is one municipality in Gerger District:
Gerger

There are 45 villages in Gerger District:

 Açma
 Ağaçlı
 Aşağıdağlıca
 Beşgöze
 Beybostan
 Budaklı
 Burçaklı
 Çamiçi
 Cevizpınar
 Çifthisar
 Çobanpınarı
 Dağdeviren
 Dallarca
 Demirtaş
 Eskikent
 Geçitli
 Gölyurt
 Gönen
 Gözpınar
 Gümüşkaşık
 Gündoğdu
 Güngörmüş
 Gürgenli
 Güzelsu
 Kaşyazı
 Kesertaş
 Kılıç
 Köklüce
 Konacık
 Korulu
 Koşarlar
 Kütüklü
 Nakışlı
 Onevler
 Ortaca
 Oymaklı
 Saraycık
 Seyitmahmut
 Sutepe
 Üçkaya
 Yağmurlu
 Yayladalı
 Yenibardak
 Yeşilyurt
 Yukarıdağlıca

There are 104 hamlets in Gerger District.

References

Districts of Adıyaman Province